Previously known as Zululand Rhino Reserve, Manyoni Private Game Reserve is a "big five" protected area in north-eastern KwaZulu-Natal, South Africa. It covers an area of 23 000 ha within the Mkuze Valley Lowveld vegetation type.

Gallery

References

Protected areas of KwaZulu-Natal
Nature reserves in South Africa